The 2021 Colonial Athletic Association men's basketball tournament was the postseason men's basketball tournament for the Colonial Athletic Association for the 2020–21 NCAA Division I men's basketball season. The tournament was held March 6–9, 2021 at the Atlantic Union Bank Center in Harrisonburg, Virginia.  The tournament was originally scheduled to be played at the Entertainment and Sports Arena in Washington, D.C., however it was relocated due to the COVID-19 pandemic. This was the first time since 1986 that the CAA has crowned its men's basketball champion at an on-campus facility.

Seeds
All 10 CAA teams participated in the tournament.

Schedule

Bracket

* denotes overtime game

See also
 2021 CAA women's basketball tournament

References

Tournament
Colonial Athletic Association men's basketball tournament
Sports in Harrisonburg, Virginia
College basketball tournaments in Virginia
CAA men's basketball tournament
CAA men's basketball tournament